The 1958 Major League Baseball All-Star Game was the 25th playing of the midsummer classic between the all-stars of the American League (AL) and National League (NL), the two leagues comprising Major League Baseball. The game was held on July 8, 1958, at Memorial Stadium in Baltimore, Maryland, the home of the Baltimore Orioles of the American League.

This was the first Major League Baseball All-Star Game without an extra base hit.

For this Diamond Jubilee game, the ceremonial first pitch was thrown by U.S. Vice President Richard Nixon, who became President 10 years later.  The attendance was 48,829.  The game was broadcast on the NBC television and radio networks.

The first hit of the game was by legendary center fielder Willie Mays. The last scoring came in the sixth inning when the American League team took the lead after an error by third baseman Frank Thomas led to a single by Gil McDougald. Early Wynn was the winning pitcher as the American League scored a 4-3 victory.

Several players were named to the team but did not get into the game.  These included Billy Pierce, Tony Kubek, Harvey Kuenn, Sherm Lollar, Rocky Bridges, Ryne Duren, Whitey Ford, and Elston Howard for the American League. For the National League team, Johnny Antonelli, Richie Ashburn, George Crowe, Eddie Mathews, Don McMahon, Walt Moryn, Johnny Podres, Bob Purkey, and Bob Schmidt were on the roster but did not play.

The next All-Star Game to be played in Baltimore was in 1993; that edition was aired on both CBS TV and radio, and played in Oriole Park at Camden Yards, with a special commemoration of this game's 35th anniversary.

Opening Lineups

Rosters

Umpires

Line Score

References

Major League Baseball All-Star Game
Major League Baseball All-Star Game
Baseball competitions in Baltimore
Major League Baseball All Star Game
July 1958 sports events  in the United States
1950s in Baltimore